Nikolay Petrovich Lomtev (( – ) was a Russian history painter and graphic artist in the Academic style.

Biography
He was born to a merchant family from Rostov in either 1816 or 1817. In the mid 1830s, the family moved to Saint Petersburg and his father was registered with the merchant's guild. Around 1837, he entered the Academy of Fine Arts and studied with the history painter, Fyodor Bruni. In 1838, Bruni went to Rome to complete some work there and he followed in 1839, at his father's expense.

In 1840, when Bruni returned to Russia, he stayed in Italy, using up his money and lapsing into drunkenness. Despite this, he continued to copy the Old Masters, sketch landscapes and keep a detailed diary of his struggles.

In 1846, at his father's request, he returned to Saint Petersburg and was awarded the title of "Artist" by the Academy for his painting of Angels proclaiming the punishment of Sodom and Gomorrah. He continued to paint primarily Biblical and historical scenes, although he also did landscapes. Some of his works were among the first bought by Pavel Tretyakov but, overall, they were not financially successful and, by the late 1850s, he was once again on the verge of poverty.

After his father's death, he received a legacy that made him financially independent but, not long after, he died from a "cold" (more likely influenza or pneumonia) in either 1858 or 1859.

Selected paintings

References

External links 

1816 births
1850s deaths
19th-century painters from the Russian Empire
Russian male painters
History painters
People from Rostov
Infectious disease deaths in Russia
Religious artists
19th-century male artists from the Russian Empire